Lower Maze Football Club is an intermediate-level football club playing in the Intermediate B division of the Mid-Ulster Football League in Northern Ireland. The club is based in Maze, County Down.

The club was formed as Lisburn Mills in 1960 and changed to its current name in 1994.

References

External links
 Lower Maze Official Club website
 Daily Mirror Mid-Ulster Football League Official website
 nifootball.co.uk - (For fixtures, results and tables of all Northern Ireland amateur football leagues)

Association football clubs in Northern Ireland
Association football clubs established in 1960
Association football clubs in County Down
Mid-Ulster Football League clubs
1960 establishments in Northern Ireland